Saribas may refer to:
Sarıbaş, a village in Azerbaijan
Saribas, a place in Sarawak
Saribas (state constituency), represented in the Sarawak State Legislative Assembly